The South East Cork Junior A Hurling Championship is an annual hurling competition organised by the Carrigdhoun Board of the Gaelic Athletic Association since 1928 for junior hurling teams in the southeastern region of County Cork, Ireland.

The series of games begin in July, with the championship culminating with the final in the autumn. The championship includes a knock-out stage and a "back door" for teams defeated in the first round.

The South East Junior Championship is an integral part of the wider Cork Junior Hurling Championship. The winners and runners-up of the South East Cork championship join their counterparts from the other six divisions to contest the county championship.

Valley Rovers are the title-holders after defeating Ballymartle by 0-16 to 0-14 in the 2022 final.

2023 Teams

Roll of honour

List of finals

Records

Gaps

Top five longest gaps between successive championship titles:
 45 years: Kinsale (1933-1978)
 28 years: Valley Rovers (1988-2016)
 27 years: Carrigaline (1947-1974)
 27 years: Ballygarvan (1977-2004)
 24 years: Shamrocks (1981-2005)
 22 years: Tracton (1957-1979)
 22 years: Ballymartle (1986-2008)
 20 years: Valley Rovers (1968-1988)
 18 years: Kinsale (1989-2007)
 18 years: Ballinhassig (1928-1946)
 18 years: Ballinhassig (1973-1991)

2022 Championship

Group stage 
Group 1

Group 2

Group 3

Knockout stage

References

External link

 Carrigdhoun GAA website

South East Junior A Hurling Championship